Reverse Engineering for Beginners is a textbook written by Dennis Yurichev about reverse engineering. It's available in 9 languages and recommended by several universities.

Editions
실전 연습으로 완성하는 리버싱, Korean, 2015. , 
 مهندسی معکوس/ دنیس یوریچو ؛ برگردان محسن مصطفی‌جوکار, Farsi, 2016. Registration of the book in National Library of Iran:  مهندسی معکوس.
逆向工程权威指南, Simplified Chinese, 2017. ,

References

External links
 Download
 Review (in Chinese)

Software engineering books
Computer security books